Himself is a reflexive pronoun in English.

Himself may also refer to:
 Himself (Bill Cosby album), a 1982 comedy album
 Bill Cosby: Himself, a 1983 stand-up comedy film
 Himself (Gilbert O'Sullivan album), 1971
 Himself (Akinori Nakagawa album)
 Intensive pronoun